Cookku with Kirikku is a Kannada-language comedy-based cooking competition show aired on Star Suvarna and streams on Disney+ Hotstar where the contestants are paired each week with comedians (Kirikkus) who are amateur cooks. It premiered on 10 April 2021. The contestants along with their kirikkus are challenged every week and judged by Sihi Kahi Chandru, Chef Venkatesh Bhat and Chef Adarsh. The Show is a remake of Tamil reality show Cooku With Comali.

Production

Game format 
Every week, the show starts with celebrity chefs getting paired with their Kirikkus. Then the teams compete in Advantage Task 1 and Task 2. The teams then compete in Main Task and Immunity/Elimination Task. The Advantage task involves a minimal task in which a team does a small task and the winner of the Advantage task is given an advantage during the main task where the team can choose a time frame to work without any obstacles. During the Main task, every team is a given a challenge or an obstacle that will make the cooking harder. The teams are given a specific time limit where they must cook with that time frame. Most of the cooking tasks are to be done by Kirikkus. The cook that gets Immunity is safe from next week's elimination and does not participate in that week. Some weeks are celebration rounds with no elimination.

Series overview

Season 1

Contestants

Kirikku's

Pairings

Weekly activities 
 Advantage Tasks

 Main Tasks

Guests

Reception 
The series gained popularity among viewers and was appreciated mainly on hotstar app.

Adaptations

References

External links 
 Cooku With Kirikku on IMDb

2021 Indian television series debuts
Kannada-language television shows
Star Suvarna original programming
Indian television series based on non-Indian television series
Kannada-language television series based on Tamil-language television series